The 2004 United States presidential election in Missouri took place on November 2, 2004, and was part of the 2004 United States presidential election. Voters chose 11 representatives, or electors to the Electoral College, who voted for president and vice president.

Missouri was won by incumbent President George W. Bush by a 7.20% margin of victory. Prior to the election, 10 of 12 news organizations considered this a state Bush would win, or otherwise considered as a red state. He also won a wide majority of the counties and congressional districts in the state. Despite the fact that the state had voted for the eventual winner of the election in every presidential election since 1904, with the exception of the 1956 election, Bush carried this state with a larger margin of victory than his nationwide results, indicating that the state had become more conservative than the rest of the country and that it was trending Republican. These factors eventually led the state to lose its bellwether status in the next election, albeit by a narrow margin.

As of 2020 is the last time Missouri voted to the left of Virginia or North Carolina, and the last time it voted significantly to the left of Indiana, as in future elections, the results of both states would align closely.

Primaries
 2004 Missouri Democratic presidential primary
 2004 Missouri Republican presidential primary

Campaign

Predictions
There were 12 news organizations who made state-by-state predictions of the election. Here are their last predictions before election day.

Polling
From May 2004, Bush won every single poll from the state. The final 3 polls taken from the state averaged Bush leading with 51% to 45%.

Fundraising
Bush raised $4,026,802. Kerry raised $1,418,159.

Advertising and visits
This state was considered a major swing state. Both the Republican ticket and Democratic ticket visited the state 7 times in the general election. Kerry focused mostly on the urban areas such as St. Louis and Kansas City, while Bush focused more on rural such as Warrenton and Sedalia.

Analysis 
This was a better result for President Bush than 2000, when he carried the state by only 3%. In 2004, he received 265,789 more votes than in 2000, while Kerry won only 148,033 more votes than Gore in 2000. Bush won by a 7% margin. Kerry won just 4 counties in the state: Jackson County, Ste. Genevieve, St. Louis County, and St. Louis City. , this is the last election in which Boone County voted for the Republican candidate.

Results

By county

Counties that flipped from Democratic to Republican
Boone (Largest city: Columbia)
Buchanan (Largest city: St. Joseph)
Clay (Largest city: Liberty)
Jefferson (Largest city: Arnold)
Mississippi (Largest city: Charleston)
New Madrid (Largest city: New Madrid)
Pemiscot (Largest city: Caruthersville)
Ray (Largest city: Richmond)
Saline (Largest city: Marshall
Washington (Largest city: Potosi)

By congressional district
Bush won 6 of 9 congressional districts, including one held by a Democrat.

Electors

Technically the voters of Missouri cast their ballots for electors: representatives to the Electoral College. Missouri is allocated 11 electors because it has 9 congressional districts and 2 senators. All candidates who appear on the ballot or qualify to receive write-in votes must submit a list of 11 electors, who pledge to vote for their candidate and his or her running mate. Whoever wins the majority of votes in the state is awarded all 11 electoral votes. Their chosen electors then vote for president and vice president. Although electors are pledged to their candidate and running mate, they are not obligated to vote for them. An elector who votes for someone other than his or her candidate is known as a faithless elector.

The electors of each state and the District of Columbia met on December 13, 2004, to cast their votes for president and vice president. The Electoral College itself never meets as one body. Instead the electors from each state and the District of Columbia met in their respective capitols.

The following were the members of the Electoral College from the state. All 11 were pledged for Bush/Cheney.
 Rosemary Kochner
 Fred Dyer
 Miriam Stonebraker
 Carolyn McDowell
 Cathy Owens
 Steve Krueger
 Emory Melton
 John Schudy
 Richard Hardy
 John Marschalk
 Warren Erdman

See also
 United States presidential elections in Missouri

References

Missouri
2004
Presidential